Pongo may refer to:

Places 
 Pongo (geography), canyon or narrow gorge in the Upper Amazon
 Pongo River (disambiguation), several rivers or estuaries in Africa
 Pongo, Kentucky, an unincorporated community
 Pongo, Longleng, village in Longleng district of Nagaland State, India

People 
 Tom 'Pongo' Waring (1906–1980), English footballer
 Joe Cantillon ("Pongo Joe", 1861–1930), U.S. manager in American Major League Baseball
 Pongo (musician) Angolan-Portuguese musician

Animals 
 Pongo (genus), the orangutans
 Pongo, chimpanzee, star attraction in 1884 at the Zoological Park in Walton, Liverpool

Fictional characters 
 Pongo Twistleton, book character from P. G. Wodehouse's Uncle Fred stories from the 1930s to 1960s
 Janice "Pongo" Footrot, comics character from Murray Ball's strip Footrot Flats (1975–1994)
 Pongo the Pirate, puppet character from Gerry Anderson's TV series Torchy the Battery Boy (1958–1959)
 "Pongo" Banks, antagonist of the 1979 Alan Clarke film Scum
 Pongo, assistant to Johhny Gan (Bobby Lee) on Mad TV (season 12)
 Pongo, puppet from Rooster Teeth short films

Fictional animals 
 Pongo, male Dalmatian dog character in The Hundred and One Dalmatians, 1956 children's novel by Dodie Smith, and other adaptations:
 One Hundred and One Dalmatians, 1961 animated film by Walt Disney
 101 Dalmatians (1996 film), a live-action film by Walt Disney Pictures
 Pongo, pampered pet dragon in the British children's television series A Rubovian Legend (1955), created by Gordon Murray
 Pongo, the Dragon, character since 2001 in U.S. animated children's show Oswald
 Pongo, Dalmatian dog character in the 2011 American television series Once Upon A Time
 Pongo, dog character of Billy The Kid in the D. C. Thomson 1970s British comics Cracker
 Pongo, circus chimpanzee (who plays a role in the plot) in Enid Blyton's 5th Famous Five book, Five Go Off in a Caravan (1946)

Fictional places 
 Checkpoint Pongo, a border post of the Concavity near Methuen, Massachusetts, in the American novel Infinite Jest

See also
 Pango Pango, a.k.a. Pago Pago, in Samoa